The William L. and Sydney V. Murphy House is a historic two-and-a-half-story house in Lincoln, Nebraska. It was built in 1889 for William L. Murphy and his wife Sydney, and it was designed in the Queen Anne style. It later belonged to art collector and patron Frances Sheldon, the namesake of the Sheldon Museum of Art. It has been listed on the National Register of Historic Places since November 4, 1994.

References

National Register of Historic Places in Lincoln, Nebraska
Queen Anne architecture in Nebraska
Houses completed in 1889
1889 establishments in Nebraska